Allium zebdanense is a Middle Eastern species of wild onion found in Israel, Palestine, Syria, Lebanon, Turkey, Caucasus and Jordan. It is a bulb-forming perennial with an umbel of cream-colored flowers.

References

zebdanense
Onions
Plants described in 1859
Taxa named by Pierre Edmond Boissier
Taxa named by Friedrich Wilhelm Noë